Thomas C. Hauser (born February 27, 1946) is an American author known for his biographies and novels.

Biography 
Hauser graduated from Columbia College in 1967 and Columbia Law School in 1970.

He made his debut as a writer in 1978 with The Execution of Charles Horman: An American Sacrifice. Horman's wife, Joyce Horman, and his parents, Edmund and Elizabeth Horman, cooperated with Hauser on the book describing both the fate of Charles and his family's quest to uncover the truth in Chile. It was adapted as Costa-Gavras's 1982 film Missing, starring Jack Lemmon and Sissy Spacek. A later book by Hauser, Final Warning: The Legacy of Chernobyl (co-authored with Robert Peter Gale), served as the basis for the 1991 television film Chernobyl: The Final Warning, starring Jon Voight and Jason Robards.In 1981, Hauser published a novel, Ashworth & Palmer, set in a fictional law firm, which was inspired by his experience as an associate at Cravath, Swaine & Moore from 1971 through 1977, following his graduation from Columbia Law School. Later novels recreated the lives of Beethoven, Mark Twain, and Charles Dickens.

Hauser also wrote Muhammad Ali: His Life and Times, a biography of boxer Muhammad Ali. The book was nominated for the National Book Award. In 1991 he was awarded the William Hill Sports Book of the Year award for Muhammad Ali: His Life and Times. Subsequently, Ali and Hauser co-authored HEALING: A Journal of Tolerance And Understanding and met with student audiences across the United States to discuss their subject. For their efforts to combat bigotry and prejudice, they were named as co-recipients of the Haviva Reik Award. More recently, Hauser authored Muhammad Ali: A Tribute to the Greatest.

He also collaborated with golfer Arnold Palmer on a biography entitled Arnold Palmer A Personal Journey published in 1994.

Hauser is a keen follower of boxing and has written about the sport for numerous print publications such as the New York Times and The Ring and various websites such as The Sweet Science, and Boxing Scene. He has been featured in numerous documentaries about the sport including the Academy Award-winning When We Were Kings.

On eight occasions, articles written by Hauser have been named "best investigative writing" of the year by the Boxing Writers Association of America. In 2004, the organization honored him with the Nat Fleischer Award for Career Excellence in Boxing Journalism. From 2012 through 2020, he was a consultant to HBO Sports. In 2003, at the request of the late Senator John McCain, Hauser testified before the United States Senate Committee on Commerce, Science and Transportation regarding the regulation of professional boxing. On December 4, 2019, it was announced that Hauser had been chosen by the electors for boxing's highest honor: induction into the International Boxing Hall of Fame.

Books

General non-fiction
 Missing The Trial of Patrolman Thomas Shea For Our Children (with Frank Macchiarola)
 The Family Legal Companion Final Warning: The Legacy of Chernobyl (with Dr. Robert Gale)
 Arnold Palmer: A Personal Journey Confronting America's Moral Crisis (with Frank Macchiarola)
 Healing: A Journal of Tolerance and Understanding With This Ring (with Frank Macchiarola)
 Thomas Hauser on Sports ReflectionsBoxing non-fiction
 The Black Lights: Inside the World of Professional Boxing Muhammad Ali: His Life and Times Muhammad Ali: Memories Muhammad Ali: In Perspective Muhammad Ali & Company A Beautiful Sickness A Year At The Fights Brutal Artistry The View From Ringside Chaos, Corruption, Courage, and Glory The Lost Legacy of Muhammad Ali I Don't Believe It, But It's True Knockout (with Vikki LaMotta)
 The Greatest Sport of All The Boxing Scene An Unforgiving Sport Boxing Is . . . Box: The Face of Boxing The Legend of Muhammad Ali (with Bart Barry)
 Winks and Daggers And the New . . . Straight Writes and Jabs Thomas Hauser on Boxing A Hurting Sport Muhammad Ali: A Tribute to the GreatestThere Will Always Be BoxingProtect Yourself At All TimesA Dangerous GameStaredownBroken DreamsFiction
 Ashworth & Palmer Agatha's Friends The Beethoven Conspiracy Hanneman's War The Fantasy Dear Hannah The Hawthorne Group Mark Twain Remembers Finding The Princess Waiting For Carver Boyd The Final Recollections of Charles Dickens The Baker's TaleFor children
 Martin Bear & Friends''

References

External links
Thomas Hauser bio at Thesweetscience.com
Thomas Hauser  bio at Fantasticfiction.co.uk

1946 births
Living people
American non-fiction writers
American biographers
American male biographers
Boxing writers
Columbia Law School alumni
Cravath, Swaine & Moore associates
American fiction writers
Lawyers from New York City
Columbia College (New York) alumni